Meyer Friedman (July 13, 1910 – April 27, 2001) was an American cardiologist who developed, with colleague Ray H. Rosenman, the theory that the "Type A" behavior of chronically angry and impatient people increases their risk of heart disease. Also a researcher, he worked until his death at 90 as director of a medical institute that bears his name.

Early years 
Friedman was born in Kansas City on July 13, 1910. He graduated from Yale University with an A.B. degree during 1931 and continued to medical school at Johns Hopkins University. He obtained his M.D. degree there during 1935. He spent the years 1936 to 1938 completing his postgraduate training at Michael Reese Hospital in Illinois.

Four years after graduating from Johns Hopkins, Friedman initiated the Harold Brunn Institute for Cardiovascular Research. This institution is still existing as part of the University of California.

Later in his life, Friedman would acknowledge that he has Type A behavior and those who knew him growing up were able to describe him as such. One acquaintance said that "in his early days he was known as Cannonball Mike, for his explosive way of coming into a room." His personality persisted until his adult life and this could also be demonstrated in the way his research assistants did not last long.

Work
Friedman and colleague Dr. Ray Rosenman began to write about the association between behavior and heart disease in scientific papers during the 1950s. They used their observations for a popular 1974 book, "Type A Behavior and Your Heart."  "Type A personality" soon became a popular term, used for people who are chronically impatient and exacting.  The work of Friedman and Rosenman began new inquiry into the association between mental states and heart disease, still being debated and investigated. Friedman "put the whole issue on the map and generated a lot of research around it. He was groundbreaking in that sense," said Dr. Stephen Fortmann, a Stanford University professor who directs its Center for Research in Disease Prevention. Friedman and Rosenman shared a cardiology practice in San Francisco during the 1950s, when they began to question the conventional wisdom about the major risk factors of heart disease. The classic risk factors, such as diet and cholesterol, "could not explain the relative epidemic of coronary disease in Western countries," said Rosenman, now dead, "because [diet] really hadn't changed. Nor had cholesterol."

Observation of chairs
The discovery of the Type A behavior was accidental and it involved a furniture. In the waiting room of the practice the two doctors ran, the chairs needed reupholstering badly. What was unusual was that the chairs were worn down on the front edges of the seats and armrests instead of on the back areas, which would have been more typical. The doctors later observed that those chairs were chosen by coronary patients, who tended to sit on the edge of the seat and leaped up often, typically to ask how much longer they would have to wait for their appointments to begin. They were evidently both tense and had heart problems. Was there an association?  After some initial observations, the doctors hypothesized that there was an association. Friedman began some studies. In one, he observed 40 accountants, to see if their cholesterol levels increased as a result of the stress of tax season. "In March, their cholesterol shot up," said Dr. Gerald W. Friedland, a Stanford University professor emeritus of radiology who collaborated with Friedman on "Medicine's 10 Greatest Discoveries," a 1998 book.

Reaction
Other doctors reacted skeptically to the Type A theory. "A lot of physicians, particularly cardiologists, are severe Type A's," said Rosenman, who rates himself a "Type A-minus." But the concept was endorsed gradually by the popular culture, with "Type A personality" becoming a cliche'—one that irritated its authors. "You can't change personalities," Friedman often said. "We just try for more B-like behavior."  During the decades ensuing, Friedman would casually diagnose public figures as Type A or B from photographs, seeing such telltale signs as a clenched jaw or pinched look between the eyes. Lyndon Johnson was Type A; Ronald Reagan was B. Friedman developed a therapy regimen to modify Type A behavior. During the 1980s, he managed a study that showed that risk of heart failure could be decreased dramatically when Type A sufferers learned, essentially, to become more relaxed (see details, below, in Research section). He wrote a 1984 book based on those findings, Treating Type A Behavior and Your Heart, that described how the people of the treatment group had new heart failures at about half the rate of those of the control group. It included a chapter concerning women, whom he found were not immune to the syndrome.

Treatment of Type A
In treatment programs, Friedman used a series of exercises to teach Type A's to emulate the mellower, more thoughtful behavior of people with Type B personality. He would ask them to leave their watches home for a day, to drive in the slower lanes, to choose the longest lines in grocery stores, and consciously to observe and talk to other people. To force Type A's to relax, he prescribed reading Marcel Proust's Remembrance of Things Past—all seven volumes. "He encouraged people to read any and all of the classics. He saw it as a way for people to re-energize or strengthen their right brain"—the creative side—"which he felt atrophied in people with Type A behavior," said Dr. Barton Sparagon, medical director of the Meyer Friedman Institute at San Francisco's Mount Zion Medical Center. Other sessions concentrated just on smiling because Type A's more typically had a hostile grimace. "Sweetness is not weakness," Friedman would often tell his patients. When he encountered resistance, he quoted Hamlet: "Assume the virtue even if you have it not . . . for its use almost can change the stamp of nature."

Friedman as Type A personality
Friedman was classic Type A and he often cited this in his lectures, emphasizing that he had two coronary bypass operations at an early age. Friedman suffered an angina attack during 1955 when he was age 45 and had the first of two heart failures 10 years later at 55.  As a result of this, Friedman attempted to alter his own type A personality to reduce stress.

He would observe that the frantic drive in people with this behavior is not always the sign of a successful person. "Type A personalities who succeed do so in spite of their impatience and hostility," he said, listing among the more notable Type Bs Winston Churchill, Harry Truman, Gerald Ford and Jimmy Carter.  In his own case, formulating the theory of Type A behavior was just one of many achievements. Friedman contributed important discoveries to the study of gout and cholesterol and helped develop the angiogram.

Research
Beginning during the 1970s, Friedman collaborated with Stanford University psychologist Carl E. Thoresen and others in the Recurrent Coronary Prevention Project, which followed 1013 heart attack survivors for 4.5 years to determine effects from altering their coronary-prone (type A) behavior patterns. Results indicated that behavioral counseling reduced rates of recurrence to 13% (from 21% or higher). After the first year, those receiving behavioral counseling also experienced significantly lesser rates of death. The study showed, "for the first time, within a controlled experimental design, that altering type A behavior reduces cardiac morbidity and mortality in post infarction patients".

Friedman published and co-authored more than 500 articles, most of them about coronary heart disease.

Death
Friedman died after a short illness in 2001 at UC San Francisco Medical Center. He was survived by a daughter, Joyce Libeu, of Rohnert Park, California; two sons, Joseph, of Mill Valley, California, and Mark, of Rohnert Park; and five grandchildren.

References

1910 births
2001 deaths
American cardiologists